John Agard FRSL (born 21 June 1949 in British Guiana) is an Afro-Guyanese playwright, poet and children's writer, now living in Britain. In 2012, he was selected for the Queen's Gold Medal for Poetry. He was awarded BookTrust's Lifetime Achievement Award in November 2021.

Biography
Agard grew up in Georgetown, British Guiana (now Guyana). He loved to listen to cricket commentary on the radio and began making up his own, which led to a love of language. He went on to study English, French and Latin at A-Level, writing his first published poetry when he was in sixth-form, and left school in 1967. He taught the languages he had studied and worked in a local library. He was also a sub-editor and feature writer for the Guyana Sunday Chronicle, publishing two books while he was still in Guyana.

His father (Ted) settled in London and Agard moved to Britain with his partner Grace Nichols in 1977, settling in Ironbridge, Shropshire. He worked for the Commonwealth Institute and the BBC in London.

His awards included the 1997 Paul Hamlyn Award for Poetry, the Cholmondeley Award in 2004 and the Queen's Gold Medal for Poetry in 2012. In November 2021 he became the first poet to be awarded BookTrust's Lifetime Achievement Award.

Agard was poet-in-residence at the National Maritime Museum in 2008. His poems "Half Caste" and "Checking Out Me History" have been featured in the AQA English GCSE anthology since 2002, meaning that many students (aged 13–16) have studied his work for their GCSE English qualifications.

Archival literary records consisting of "letters and proofs relating to the published poetry works of John Agard" are held at Newcastle University Special Collections, in the Bloodaxe Books Archive.

Agard lives in Lewes, East Sussex, with his partner, the Guyanese poet Grace Nichols.

Bibliography

Listen Mr Oxford Don, 1967
Shoot Me With Flowers. Georgetown, Guyana, 1974
Letters for Lettie, and Other Stories. Bodley Head, 1978
Dig Away Two-Hole Tim. Bodley Head, 1981
Man to Pan. Casa de las Américas (Cuba), 1982
I Din Do Nuttin, and Other Poems. Bodley Head, 1982
Limbo Dancer in Dark Glasses. Greenheart, 1983
Livingroom. Black Ink, 1983
Mangoes and Bullets: Selected and New Poems 1972–84. Pluto Press, 1985
Say It Again, Granny!. Bodley Head, 1986
Lend Me Your Wings. Hodder & Stoughton, 1998
Go Noah Go!. Hodder & Stoughton, 1990
Laughter is an Egg. Viking, 1990
The Calypso Alphabet. Collins, 1990
No Hickory, No Dickory, No Dock (with Grace Nichols). Viking, 1991
The Emperor's Dan-dan. Hodder & Stoughton, 1992
A Stone's Throw from Embankment: The South Bank Collection. Royal Festival Hall, 1993
The Great Snakeskin. Ginn, 1993
Grandfather's Old Bruk-a-Down Car. Bodley Head, 1994
Oriki and the Monster Who Hated Balloons. Longman, 1994
The Monster Who Loved Cameras. Longman, 1994
The Monster Who Loved Telephones. Longman, 1994
The Monster Who Loved Toothbrushes. Longman, 1994
Eat a Poem, Wear a Poem. Heinemann Young Books, 1995
Get Back, Pimple!. Viking, 1996
We Animals Would Like a Word With You. Bodley Head, 1996
From the Devil's Pulpit. Bloodaxe, 1997 
Brer Rabbit: The Great Tug-o-war. Bodley Head, 1998
Points of View with Professor Peekabo. Bodley Head, 2000
Weblines. Bloodaxe, 2000 
Come Back to Me My Boomerang (with Lydia Monks). Orchard, 2001
Einstein, The Girl Who Hated Maths. Hodder Children's Books, 2002
Number Parade: Number Poems from 0–100 (with Jackie Kay, Grace Nichols, Nick Toczek and Mike Rosen). LDA, 2002
Hello H2O. Hodder Children's Books, 2003
From Mouth to Mouth (with Grace Nichols; illustrated by Annabel Wright). Walker, 2004
Baby Poems. Frances Lincoln Children's Books, 2005
Half-Caste. Hodder & Stoughton, 2005
Butter-Finger (with Bob Cattell, illustrated by Pam Smy). Frances Lincoln Children's Books, 2006
We Brits. Bloodaxe, 2006 
Wriggle Piggy Toes (with Jenny Bent). Frances Lincoln Children's Books, 2006
Shine On, Butter-Finger (with Bob Cattell, illustrated by Pam Smy). Frances Lincoln Children's Books, 2007
Checking Out Me History, 2007
The Young Inferno (illustrated by Satoshi Kitamura). Frances Lincoln Children's Books, 2008
Tiger Dead! Tiger Dead!: Stories from the Caribbean (with Grace Nichols, illustrated by Satoshi Kitamura). Collins Educational, 2008
Alternative Anthem: Selected Poems (with DVD). Bloodaxe, 2009. 
Clever Backbone.Bloodaxe, 2009 
The Young Inferno (illustrated by Satoshi Kitamura). Frances Lincoln Children's Books, 2009
Goldilocks on CCTV (illustrated by Satoshi Kitamura). Frances Lincoln Children's Books, 2011
Travel Light Travel Dark. Bloodaxe, 2013.

As editor
Life Doesn't Frighten Me at All. Heinemann, 1989
A Caribbean Dozen (co-edited with Grace Nichols). Walker Books, 1994
Poems in My Earphone. Longman, 1995
Why is the Sky?. Faber and Faber, 1996
A Child's Year of Stories and Poems (with Michael Rosen and Robert Frost). Viking Children's Books, 2000
Hello New!: New Poems for a New Century. Orchard, 2000
Under the Moon and Over the Sea (co-editor with Grace Nichols). Walker Books, 2002

Awards
Casa de las Américas Prize (Cuba) for Man to Pan
1987: Nestlé Smarties Book Prize (shortlist) for Lend Me Your Wings
1995: Nestlé Smarties Book Prize (Bronze Award) (6–8 years category) for We Animals Would Like a Word With You
1997: Paul Hamlyn Award for Poetry
2004: Cholmondeley Award
2007: British Book Awards Decibel Writer of the Year (shortlist) for We Brits
2007: Elected a Fellow of the Royal Society of Literature
2009: Centre for Literacy in Primary Education poetry award for The Young Inferno.
2012: Queen's Gold Medal for Poetry
2021: BookTrust Lifetime Achievement Award

References

External links 
 Shoot Me with Flowers, The British Library, 23 November 2021 – Asgard's first book of poems acquired for the British Library's collection
"John Agard: Making Waves at the BBC". The Poetry Society.
 (includes extensive bibliography)
John Agard at the National Maritime Museum
 An example of John Agard reading his poetry – .

1949 births
Living people
Black British writers
Afro-Guyanese people
British children's writers
British dramatists and playwrights
Guyanese dramatists and playwrights
Guyanese poets
Postcolonial literature
Fellows of the Royal Society of Literature
20th-century British poets
21st-century British poets
21st-century British male writers
People from Georgetown, Guyana
British male poets
British male dramatists and playwrights
20th-century Guyanese writers
21st-century Guyanese writers
Guyanese emigrants to England